The 2016 Gwangju Open was a professional tennis tournament played on hard courts. It was the 1st edition of the tournament which was part of the 2016 ATP Challenger Tour. It took place in Gwangju, South Korea between 11 and 17 April 2016.

Singles main-draw entrants

Seeds

 1 Rankings as of April 4, 2016.

Other entrants
The following players received wildcards into the singles main draw:
  Kwon Soon-woo
  Chung Yun-seong
  Lim Yong-kyu
  Chung Hong

The following players received entry from the qualifying draw:
  Liam Broady
  Greg Jones
  Gavin van Peperzeel
  Wishaya Trongcharoenchaikul

The following player received entry as a lucky loser:
  Daniel Yoo

Champions

Singles

  Ričardas Berankis def.  Grega Žemlja, 6–3, 6–2

Doubles

  Sanchai Ratiwatana /  Sonchat Ratiwatana def.  Frederik Nielsen /  David O'Hare, 6–3, 6–2

External links
Combined Draw

Gwangju Open
2016 in South Korean tennis
Tennis tournaments in South Korea